William Shepherd (born 1949) is an American astronaut, commander of the Expedition One crew on the International Space Station.

William Shepherd may also refer to:

William Shepherd (British politician) (1910–2002), British Conservative MP, 1945–1966
William Shepherd (English cricketer) (1840–1919), English cricketer
William Shepherd (Trinidadian cricketer) (1873-1955), Trinidadian cricketer
William Robert Shepherd (1871–1934), U.S. cartographer and historian
William Shepherd (Massachusetts politician) (1837–1907), Massachusetts politician
Bill Shepherd (American football) (1911–1967), American football player
Billy Shepherd (basketball) (born 1949), American basketball player
Bill Shepherd (English footballer) (1920–1983), English footballer for Liverpool F.C.
Bill Shepherd (politician), chairman of the Northland Regional Council, New Zealand
William Shepherd (minister) (1768–1847), English dissenting minister and politician
William Shepherd (wrestler), British Olympic wrestler
William James Affleck Shepherd (1866–1946), English illustrator and cartoonist
Billy Shepherd, pseudonym of Peter Jones (1930–2015), British music journalist
Billy Shepherd (footballer) (1894–1936), English footballer

See also
William Sheppard (disambiguation)
William Shepard (disambiguation)